JT-010 is a chemical compound which acts as a potent, selective activator of the TRPA1 channel, and has been used to study the role of this receptor in the perception of pain, as well as other actions such as promoting repair of dental tissue after damage.

See also 
 ASP-7663
 PF-4840154

References 

Nitrogen mustards
Thiazoles
Amides
Phenyl compounds
Ethers
Transient receptor potential channel agonists